Clairlea is a neighbourhood in Toronto, Ontario, Canada. The neighbourhood is located in the western part of the district of Scarborough just east of Victoria Park Avenue. To the north, it is bounded by Eglinton Avenue and to the south by Taylor-Massey Creek and the railway tracks. The neighborhood is served by Warden station and the Don Valley Parkway. A large portion of Clairlea-Birchmount is taken up by shopping centres, the Eglinton Square Shopping Centre and other large retail developments along what was once Scarborough’s old Golden Mile of Industry on Eglinton Avenue.

History

In the 19th century the intersection of St. Clair and Victoria Park was home to a small village named Moffat's Corners, and the rest of the region was rural. Clairlea was one of the first parts of Scarborough to be developed as a Toronto suburb, being transformed in the early 1950s. A major employer and landmark is Providence Healthcare, established on St. Clair in 1962. Today, it consists of a hospital specializing in rehabilitation and complex continuing care, a nursing home called the Cardinal Ambrozic Houses of Providence, and Providence Community Centre, which offers clinics and support programs for seniors and caregivers. Today it is a middle income neighbourhood that features many affordable homes and mature streets.

Demographics
There is a large Filipino contingency in this neighbourhood, at least compared to the rest of the city (8%) and a correspondingly large number of residents who speak Tagalog. Filipino born individuals accounted for 2% of this census tract population in 2006, in 2011 Filipino born dwellers made up 9.9% of the total CT population.  This is not surprising as in 2011, Philippines went from third most common Place of Birth in Canada to first most common (Census Canada, 2006, NHS, 2011). The second most notable demographic in Clairlea-Birchmount is the Bangladeshi community, which accounts for less than 10% of the total CT population. The neighbourhood is quite diverse from languages spoken to religions practiced which is typical in the city of Toronto.

Education

Two public school boards operate schools within Clairlea, the Toronto Catholic District School Board (TCDSB), and the Toronto District School Board (TDSB). TCDSB is a public separate school board, whereas TDSB is a public secular school board.

TDSB operates  several institutions in the neighbourhood, including one public secondary school, W. A. Porter Collegiate Institute. In addition to a secondary school, TDSB and the TCDSB also operates the following two three elementary schools:

Clairlea Public School is located on Rosalind Crescent in Scarborough, first opened in 1952. Starting in 2002, the French Immersion program was introduced to the school.
Regent Heights Public School is a elementary school that began in 1921 as Regent's Park Public School in a one room schoolhouse. With the formation of Scarborough Public School Area # 1, Regent's Park School was separated from Oakridge and construction began on a new brick school on its current location, which was completed and opened on September 15, 1947. Between 1951 and 1952, 12 classrooms and a gym were added with the two existing classrooms later converted to a library in 1972. In 1954, the school was renamed to Regent Heights to avoid confusion with the Regent Park community in Toronto. It became a junior school operating from Kindergarten to Grade 6 with the opening of Samuel Hearne Senior Public School. In September 1975, the French Immersion program was introduced, though the program was relocated to Clairlea P.S. in 2002. Regent Heights now operates from Kindergarten to grade 8 after Oakridge Jr. and Samuel Hearne Sr. increased its enrollment and the school is now enrolled with 560 pupils.
Our Lady of Fatima School is a Roman Catholic school located on 3176 St. Clair Avenue East. It opened in September 1953 in the original Two stores school building and later underwent expansion and change. The older building was demolished and replaced by a new three storey school in 2004. During that period, students were taught in the old St. Aloysius school in East York during reconstruction. The school is named after Our Lady of Fátima, a title used by the Blessed Virgin Mary sighted in 1917 by three Portuguese children. It shares the name with a church located next door.

Because TCDSB does not operate a secondary school in Clairlea, TCDSB students residing in Clairlea attend secondary schools in adjacent neighbourhoods.

The French first language school boards Conseil scolaire Viamonde (CSV) and the Conseil scolaire catholique MonAvenir (CSCM) also serves students residing Clairlea. However, neither school board operates an institution in the neighbourhood, requiring them to attend CSV or CSCM schools in adjacent neighbourhoods.

Recreation
The Warden Woods ravine is the landmark of the neighbourhood, offering some downtown nature following Massey Creek east of Pharmacy Avenue to St. Clair Avenue. Warden Hilltop Community Centre holds the distinction of being the first public building in Toronto to be LEED (Leadership in Energy and Environmental Design) Silver certified. It features a geothermal heating and cooling system, green roof and solar power. The centre includes a double gym, weight room, teaching kitchen and preschool area.  The Warden Hilltop Community Centre is named after Hilltop Boarding and Riding Stables, also known as the Three Gaits Stables that was previously on the site.

References

External links

City profile of Clairlea-Birchmount
Toronto Neighbourhoods guide

Neighbourhoods in Toronto
Scarborough, Toronto